John Gill Shorter (April 23, 1818 – May 29, 1872) was an American politician who served as the 17th Governor of Alabama from 1861 to 1863. Before assuming the governorship, Shorter was a Deputy from Alabama to the Provisional Congress of the Confederate States from February 1861 to December 1861.

Biography 
John Gill Shorter was born on April 23, 1818, in Monticello, Georgia. History records him as a member of the planter class and an ardent secessionist. During his term of office, Shorter sent state troops to Randolph and other counties to put down resistance to the war effort. In the 1863 election, he was defeated by Thomas H. Watts by three votes to one. Shorter died on May 29, 1872, in Eufaula, Alabama.

References

Further reading 
 History of the University of Georgia, Thomas Walter Reed,  Imprint:  Athens, Georgia : University of Georgia, ca. 1949 p.392

External links 
 
 John Gill Shorter at The Political Graveyard

1818 births
1872 deaths
19th-century American politicians
Alabama lawyers
Burials in Alabama
Confederate States of America state governors
Democratic Party governors of Alabama
Deputies and delegates to the Provisional Congress of the Confederate States
People from Monticello, Georgia
People of Alabama in the American Civil War
People from Eufaula, Alabama
Signers of the Confederate States Constitution
Signers of the Provisional Constitution of the Confederate States
University of Georgia alumni
19th-century American lawyers